Orzhiv is an urban-type settlement in Rivne Raion (district) of Rivne Oblast (province) in western Ukraine. Its population was 4,230 as of the 2001 Ukrainian Census. Current population:

History
Orzhiv was first founded in the beginning of the 16th century, and it acquired the status of an urban-type settlement in 1959.

Geography
The town is 20 km northwest of Rivne, 61 km east of Lutsk. It counts a railway station on the Rivne-Kovel line, and is also the eastern terminus of the "Tunnel of Love", an amusement railway linking it to Klevan, surrounded by green arches.

See also
 Klevan and Kvasyliv, the other two urban-type settlements in Rivne Raion of Rivne Oblast

References

External links

Urban-type settlements in Rivne Raion
Populated places established in the 1500s